Plutarchia may refer to:
 Plutarchia (wasp), a genus of wasps in the family Eurytomidae
 Plutarchia (plant), a genus of plants in the family Ericaceae
 Plutarchia, a genus of mites in the family Syringobiidae, synonym of Plutarchusia